The Supply Laundry Building is a historic building in the Cascade neighborhood in South Lake Union, Seattle, Washington, United States, that is listed on the National Register of Historic Places.

It has now been converted into an Amazon office but retains the historical appearance of the historical building.

See also
 National Register of Historic Places listings in Seattle, Washington

References

External links

1900s architecture in the United States
1906 establishments in Washington (state)
Buildings and structures completed in 1906
Industrial buildings completed in 1906
National Register of Historic Places in Seattle